A salchipapa or salchipapas is a South American  fast food dish commonly consumed as street food, typically consisting of thinly sliced pan-fried beef sausages and French fries, mixed together with a savory coleslaw on the side. The dish's name is a portmanteau of the Spanish words salchicha (sausage) and papa (potato). The dish is served with different sauces, such as ketchup and mustard, crema de aceituna (olive sauce), along with aji or chili peppers. Sometimes a fried egg or cheese is added on top; it can also be served with tomato and lettuce, and is occasionally garnished with oregano.

History 

The salchipapa was invented as a street food in Lima, Peru. Over the years, it expanded to other places in Peru. In Latin America, the dish's popularity has expanded beyond Peruvian cuisine, and is now also typical of Colombian cuisine and Bolivian cuisine. The dish is also sold on Argentinian and Ecuadorian streets and markets.

The range of the dish keeps expanding due to the Bolivian immigration in Argentina and the Colombian and Peruvian restaurants in the United States and Chile.  There is a variant known as "choripapas" (made with chorizo instead of sausage). They can also be found in Mexico.

Gallery

See also 

 Salchichón
 Junk food
 List of Peruvian dishes
 List of sausage dishes
Currywurst

Footnotes

References

Bibliography

External links 

 South American Food – Website about Salchipapas.

Fast food
Latin American cuisine
Potato dishes
Peruvian cuisine
Sausage dishes
Street food